Below are the squads for the Football at the 1951 Asian Games in New Delhi, India.

Afghanistan

Burma

India

Coach: Syed Abdul Rahim

Indonesia

Coach:  Choo Seng-Quee

Iran
Coach: Hossein Sadaghiani

Japan
Coach: Hirokazu Ninomiya (player-coach)

References

RSSSF

External links

Squads
1951